Iron Gate is a town in eastern Alleghany County, Virginia, United States. The population was 324 at the 2020 census. The town is located along U.S. Route 220, near Clifton Forge.

History
The Town of Iron Gate was incorporated in 1889. The town's founding was a direct result of the Iron Age. During the 1880s, iron mines began opening in Alleghany County and the Alleghany Iron and Ore Company opened its blast furnace in the northern end of Iron Gate. The proximity to the railroad made the site of Iron Gate an optimal location. Many men were employed by the company until 1919 when operations ceased.

Geography
Iron Gate is located at  (37.798484, -79.791219).

According to the United States Census Bureau, the town has a total area of 0.3 square miles (0.9 km²), all of it land.  Iron Gate is also where the head waters of the James River arise.

Climate
The climate in this area has mild differences between highs and lows, and there is adequate rainfall year-round.  According to the Köppen Climate Classification system, Iron Gate has a marine west coast climate, abbreviated "Cfb" on climate maps.

Demographics

2020 census
As of the census of 2020, there were 324 people residing in the CDP. There were 170 housing units. The racial makeup of the CDP was 87.3% White, 5.2% African American or Black, 0.3% American Indian, 0.3% Asian, 0.0% Pacific Islander, 0.0% from other races, and 6.8% from two or more races. Hispanic or Latino of any race were 1.5% of the population.

2010 census
As of the census of 2010, there were 388 people residing in the CDP. There were 183 housing units. The racial makeup of the CDP was 94.8% White, 3.9% Black or African American, 0.0% Native American, 0.0% Asian, 0.3% Pacific Islander, 0.0% from other races, and 1.0% from two or more races. 1.0% of the population were Hispanic or Latino of any race.

2000 census
At the 2000 census there were 404 people, 185 households, and 121 families living in the town. The population density was 1,170.6 people per square mile (445.7/km²). There were 197 housing units at an average density of 570.8 per square mile (217.3/km²).  The racial makeup of the town was 94.55% White, 5.20% African American, and 0.25% from two or more races.
Of the 185 households 17.3% had children under the age of 18 living with them, 54.6% were married couples living together, 7.6% had a female householder with no husband present, and 34.1% were non-families. 31.9% of households were one person and 17.8% were one person aged 65 or older. The average household size was 2.18 and the average family size was 2.73.

The age distribution was 16.6% under the age of 18, 8.2% from 18 to 24, 24.0% from 25 to 44, 27.5% from 45 to 64, and 23.8% 65 or older. The median age was 46 years. For every 100 females, there were 96.1 males. For every 100 females age 18 and over, there were 94.8 males.

The median household income was $26,094 and the median family income  was $34,464. Males had a median income of $27,222 versus $17,500 for females. The per capita income for the town was $16,703. About 7.4% of families and 9.9% of the population were below the poverty line, including 8.8% of those under age 18 and 13.7% of those age 65 or over.

Government
Iron Gate operates a Mayor–council form of government. Iron Gate Town Council is composed of a mayor and six council members who are elected at-large.

Law enforcement is provided by the Alleghany County Sheriff's Office. Fire protection is provided by the Iron Gate Volunteer Fire Department which operates a fire station within the town. Emergency medical services are provided by the Iron Gate Volunteer Fire Department and Clifton Forge Rescue Squad.

Education
Iron Gate is served by Alleghany County Public Schools. Public school students residing in Iron Gate are zoned to attend Sharon Elementary School, Clifton Middle School (until 2023), and Alleghany High School.

Mountain Gateway Community College in nearby Clifton Forge is the closest higher education institution to the CDP.

Transportation

Air
The Greenbrier Valley Airport and Roanoke-Blacksburg Regional Airport are the closest airports with commercial service to the town.

Roads
 U.S. Route 220

Rail
The CSX operated James River Subdivision runs through the town. The closest passenger rail service is located in Clifton Forge.

References

Towns in Alleghany County, Virginia
Populated places on the James River (Virginia)